Jon Tyler Webb (born July 20, 1990) is an American professional baseball pitcher in the Minnesota Twins organization. The New York Yankees selected Webb in the tenth round of the 2013 Major League Baseball draft. He made his MLB debut in 2017 for the Yankees and has also played in Major League Baseball (MLB) for the Milwaukee Brewers, San Diego Padres, and St. Louis Cardinals. Webb played college baseball for the University of South Carolina.

Career

Amateur career
Webb attended Northampton High School in Eastville, Virginia. After graduating from high school, Webb enrolled at the University of South Carolina, where he played college baseball for the South Carolina Gamecocks baseball team. He was a member of the 2010 and 2011 College World Series championship teams. In 2012, his junior year, Webb pitched to a 6–1 win–loss record and a 1.56 earned run average (ERA), and recorded 58 strikeouts in  innings pitched. Before his senior year, the National Collegiate Baseball Writers Association named Webb a second-team preseason All-American. Serving as the Gamecocks' closer, Webb recorded 17 saves in the 2013 season, and was named a third-team All-American by Collegiate Baseball and a second-team All-Southeastern Conference pitcher after the season. He finished his Gamecocks' career with a 2.34 ERA and the record for games pitched (110).

New York Yankees
The New York Yankees selected Webb in the tenth round, with the 314th overall selection, of the 2013 Major League Baseball draft. The Yankees assigned him to the Staten Island Yankees of the Class A-Short Season New York–Penn League after he signed, but promoted him to the Charleston RiverDogs of the Class A South Atlantic League two weeks later. Over  relief innings, he went 3–1 with a 3.31 ERA. Webb began the 2014 season with the Tampa Yankees of the Class A-Advanced Florida State League, and was promoted to the Trenton Thunder of the Class AA Eastern League in May, with whom he was named an Eastern League All-Star. Webb was promoted to the Scranton/Wilkes-Barre RailRiders of the Class AAA International League following the All-Star break. For the season, Webb went 3–6 with a 3.80 ERA and 12 saves and 94 strikeouts in 48 games and  innings pitched.

Webb received a non-roster invitation to spring training with the Yankees in 2015, and opened the season with Scranton/Wilkes-Barre. Due to a tendon injury, he only pitched 38 innings during the season (going 2–3 with a 2.84 ERA), and the Yankees assigned Webb to the Arizona Fall League after the regular season. In 2016, he pitched for Scranton/Wilkes-Barre, going 4–3 with a 3.59 ERA over  innings pitched out of the bullpen.

On December 8, 2016, the Pittsburgh Pirates selected Webb from the Yankees in the Rule 5 draft. He competed for a role with the Pirates during spring training, but did not make the 25-man roster and was returned to the Yankees before the regular season. Webb began the 2017 season with Scranton/Wilkes-Barre.

The Yankees promoted Webb to the major leagues on June 22, 2017, and he made his MLB debut on June 24. He made seven relief appearances for the Yankees, pitching to a 4.50 ERA while striking out five and walking four in six innings.

Milwaukee Brewers
On July 13, 2017, the Yankees traded Webb to the Milwaukee Brewers for Garrett Cooper. Following the trade, Webb pitched for Milwaukee and the Colorado Springs Sky Sox of the Class AAA Pacific Coast League (PCL). Over two innings with Milwaukee, he gave up two runs, and over 17 games with Colorado Springs, he went 1–2 with a 6.48 ERA. Webb was designated for assignment on April 7, 2018.

San Diego Padres
On April 14, 2018, Webb was claimed off waivers by the San Diego Padres. He made one appearance for the El Paso Chihuahuas of the PCL before the Padres promoted him to the major leagues.

St. Louis Cardinals
On June 29, 2018, Webb was claimed off waivers by the St. Louis Cardinals and assigned to the Class AAA Memphis Redbirds of the PCL. He was recalled by St. Louis on July 27. In  innings pitched for St. Louis, he compiled a 1.76 ERA.

Webb began 2019 with Memphis. He was recalled by the Cardinals for the first time in 2019 on April 7, and optioned back to Memphis on July 11. He was recalled on July 21, finishing the season with St. Louis Over 65 relief appearances during the regular season, he went 2–1 with a 3.76 ERA, striking out 48 over 55 innings.

In 2020 for the Cardinals, Webb recorded a 2.08 ERA and a 1-1 record in 21.2 innings pitched across 21 games. After struggling to a 13.22 ERA in 22 appearances in 2021, Webb was designated for assignment by the Cardinals on June 3, 2021. He was outrighted to the Triple-A Memphis Redbirds on June 6. Webb elected free agency on October 14.

Long Island Ducks
On April 4, 2022, Webb signed with the Long Island Ducks of the Atlantic League of Professional Baseball. Webb made 53 appearances for the Ducks, working to a 2-5 record and 2.93 ERA with 68 strikeouts and 15 saves in 55.1 innings pitched.

Minnesota Twins
On February 8, 2023, Webb signed a minor league contract with the Minnesota Twins organization.

Personal life
Webb's father, Kirk, pitched in college baseball for Old Dominion University.

Webb and his wife, Lauren, were married in December 2014.

Prior to Webb's first promotion to the Yankees, he had never been to a major league game.

See also
Rule 5 draft results

References

External links

Living people
1990 births
People from Northampton County, Virginia
Baseball players from Virginia
Major League Baseball pitchers
New York Yankees players
Milwaukee Brewers players
San Diego Padres players
St. Louis Cardinals players
South Carolina Gamecocks baseball players
Staten Island Yankees players
Charleston RiverDogs players
Tampa Yankees players
Trenton Thunder players
Scranton/Wilkes-Barre RailRiders players
Surprise Saguaros players
Colorado Springs Sky Sox players
El Paso Chihuahuas players
Memphis Redbirds players
Long Island Ducks players